Menosoma is a genus of leafhoppers in the family Cicadellidae. There are about 12 described species in Menosoma. Menosoma is in the tribe Bahitini within the subfamily Deltocephalinae.

Species
These 12 species belong to the genus Menosoma:

 Menosoma cincta Osborn & Ball, 1898 c g b
 Menosoma elegans Osborn 1923 c g
 Menosoma flavolineata Linnavuori & DeLong 1978 c g
 Menosoma inprica Cheng 1980 c g
 Menosoma longita Cheng 1980 c g
 Menosoma monticola Linnavuori 1959 c g
 Menosoma picta Zanol 1989 c g
 Menosoma pseudotaeniata Linnavuori & DeLong 1978 c g
 Menosoma randali Zanol 2001 c g
 Menosoma stonei Ball 1931 c g
 Menosoma taeniata Linnavuori 1955 c g
 Menosoma xavantinense Zanol 2001 c g

Data sources: i = ITIS, c = Catalogue of Life, g = GBIF, b = Bugguide.net

References

Further reading

External links

 

Bahitini
Cicadellidae genera